Ginsu is a brand of direct marketed knives, owned by Scott Fetzer Company, a Berkshire Hathaway Company, that was made popular in the United States by being sold on television using infomercials characterized by hawker and hard sell pitch techniques. The ads fueled sales of between two and three million Ginsu sets between 1978 and 1984.

History
Ginsu knives were originally called Quikut. The Quikut division of Scott Fetzer Company  was located in Fremont, Ohio.  Because the brand name "Quikut" lacked panache, Ed Valenti, Barry Becher, and copywriter Arthur Schiff created a new brand name that alluded to the exceptional sharpness and durability of a  Japanese sword. As Valenti told the Palm Beach Post in 2011, "The challenge was to position the product so that it made every other knife you owned obsolete."

The resulting Ginsu ads copied the hard sell direct marketing techniques of carnival hawkers that pioneering TV pitchman Ron Popeil had adapted to the medium in the 1960s. In the process, they helped solidify the formula for the modern infomercial. The  ads were ubiquitous in the late 1970s on U.S. television. Advertisements for the "amazing" Ginsu knife asked, "Now how much would you pay? Don't answer!" urged viewers to "Call now! Operators are standing by!", and included the signature "But wait! There's more!", which became a popular infomercial catch phrase, and has been used ever since.

Media scholar Robert Thompson, of Syracuse University, called the Ginsu advertising campaign "the pitch of all pitches." "Ginsu has everything a great direct-response commercial could have," said John Witek, a marketing consultant and author of Response Television: Combat Advertising of the 1980s. "Ginsu had humor, demonstration, and a precisely structured series of premium offers I call 'the lots-for-a-little approach'."

Valenti and Becher later repeated the advertising formula with other products such as the Miracle Slicer, Royal Durasteel mixing bowls, Vacufresh storage containers, the Chainge Adjustable Necklace, and Armourcote Cookware. TV pitchmen Billy Mays and Vince Offer employed the hard-sell informercial to great success in more contemporary times.

While the name Ginsu was invented by Becher, Becher later (satirically) told an interviewer the word translates to, "I never have to work again." In April 2009, a stretch of road in Warwick, Rhode Island, which passes the office of Ed Valenti, was named "Ginsu Way."

The knife brand gained notoriety in 1993 when Lorena Bobbitt used a Ginsu kitchen knife to sever her husband's penis while he slept.

Current operations 
, Ginsu knives are still manufactured and sold. The Quikut and Ginsu brands have both been manufactured in Walnut Ridge, Arkansas, since the Douglas (vacuum cleaners) and Quikut (knives) operating units of Scott Fetzer merged after 1985. Douglas Quikut also manufactures ReadiVac and American Angler brands.

In 2013, Consumer Reports reviewed the Ginsu Chikara knife set in their comparison of fifty knife sets and rated it as their "Best Buy."

In 2022 Ginsu expanded beyond knives and launched a Kamado grill in a partnership with MyDIY Center.

References

Further reading

.
.
.

External links
 Official Ginsu Website
 Ginsu Guys.com
 He Sliced and Diced His Way Into Pop Culture
 PriMediaHQ.com
 Original Ginsu Commercial

Kitchen knife brands
Direct marketing
Products introduced in 1976
Fremont, Ohio